Parvez Hashmi (born 24 November 1954) is a politician born in Allahabad, Uttar Pradesh. He was a Member of Parliament, representing Delhi in the Rajya Sabha (the upper house of India's Parliament) for the second term of 2012-2018.

He belongs to the Indian National Congress  political party. He was member of Legislative Assembly of Delhi during 1993-98, 1998-2003, 2003-2008 and 2008-2009. He was elected to Rajya Sabha for the first term in 2009 from Delhi.

Since February 2012 he was Member of Committee on Government Assurances in Rajya Sabha.

Positions held

References

1954 births
Living people
Rajya Sabha members from Delhi
Politicians from Allahabad
Indian National Congress politicians from Uttar Pradesh
Janata Dal politicians